In chemical separation processes, an Energy separating agent (ESA) is the heat or shaft work added to facilitate the separation of two chemical species. It is contrasted with a mass separating agent, which is any chemical species added to the reaction that facilitates the reaction. ESAs are used in many common separation procedures.

Some important examples of procedures utilizing ESAs are vaporization (heat added), distillation (heat added), crystallization (heat evolved), and stripping (heat added).

Chemical engineering